The Interregnum (between rulers) period in Transjordan, following the ending of the Franco-Syrian War on 25 July 1920 until Abdullah's entry into Transjordan between November 1920 and March 1921, was a short period during which Transjordan had no established ruler or occupying power. Transjordan then became a no man's land or, as Sir Herbert Samuel put it, "left politically derelict"; the region was extremely poor, sparsely populated and widely considered ungovernable.

The British in the neighbouring Mandatory Palestine chose to avoid "any definite connection between it and Palestine", and the British "Sharifian Solution" for the area began to be developed. The World Zionist Organization tried and failed to have the area added to Mandatory Palestine. The efforts of the High Commissioner for Palestine, Herbert Samuel, were overruled by the British Foreign Minister Lord Curzon.

British decision not to impose direct occupation

Development of policy
In early 1920, two principles emerged within the British government: the first was that the Palestine government would not extend east of the Jordan, and the second was the government's chosen albeit disputed interpretation of the 1915 McMahon-Hussein Correspondence which proposed that Transjordan had been included in the area of "Arab independence" whilst Palestine had been excluded.

At the beginning of the interregnum in Transjordan, the British suddenly wanted to know 'what is the "Syria" for which the French received a mandate at San Remo?' and "does it include Transjordania?". British Foreign Minister Curzon ultimately decided that it did not and that Transjordan would remain independent, but in the closest relation with Palestine.

Zionist efforts to add Transjordan to the Palestine administration
On 6 August 1920, British Foreign Secretary Earl Curzon wrote to newly appointed High Commissioner Herbert Samuel regarding Transjordan, stating: "I suggest that you should let it be known forthwith that in the area south of the Sykes-Picot line, we will not admit French authority and that our policy for this area to be independent but in closest relations with Palestine." Samuel replied to Curzon, "After the fall of Damascus a fortnight ago...Sheiks and tribes east of Jordan utterly dissatisfied with Shareefian Government most unlikely would accept revival," and asked to put parts of Transjordan directly under his administrative control. Two weeks later, on 21 August, Samuel then visited Transjordan without authority from London; at a meeting with 600 leaders in Salt, he announced the independence of the area from Damascus and its absorption into the mandate, quadrupling the area under his control by tacit capitulation. Samuel assured his audience that Transjordan would not be merged with Palestine. Curzon was in the process of reducing British military expenditures and was unwilling to commit any significant resources to an area considered to be of marginal strategic value. Curzon immediately repudiated Samuel's action; on 26 August he sent, via the Foreign Office, a restatement of his instructions to minimize the scope of British involvement in the area in particular stating that "There must be no question of setting up any British administration in that area". At the end of September 1920, Curzon instructed Vansittart to leave the eastern boundary of Palestine undefined, and to avoid "any definite connection" between Transjordan and Palestine, in order to leave the way open for an Arab government in Transjordan.

Curzon wrote in February 1921: "I am very concerned about Transjordania... Sir H.Samuel wants it as an annex of Palestine and an outlet for the Jews. Here I am against him."

Local governments
Following Samuel's speech in August 1920, the British began to encourage the setting up of local autonomous governments in the following regions. Six junior political officers were sent to the region to advise on the creation of self-government; no military support was provided, they were given limited financial support, and some of the officers could not speak Arabic. The arrangement lasted until April 1921, although by early February 1921 the British had concluded that "[Abdullah's] influence has now completely replaced that of the local governments and of the British advisers in Trans-Jordania".

Ajlun region
Major FitzRoy Somerset and Captain Reginald Monckton were the assigned British political officers.

The area was the most densely populated in the country and was subsequently split into four governments: Jabal Ajlun, Kura, Irbid, and Jerash. The Jerash Local Government was led by Muhammad Ali Al-Mughrabi.

Balqa region

Salt
Major J. N. Camp and Captain Chisholm Dunbar Brunton were the assigned British political officers, later handing over to Captain Frederick Peake, who took overall control of the gendarmerie.

Amman
Captain Alan Kirkbride (younger brother of Alec) was the assigned British political officer.

Kerak region
Captain Alec Kirkbride was the assigned British political officer.

Named by Kirkbride as the "National Government of Moab".

Considered the most successful of the governments.

Notes

References

Bibliography
 
 
 
 
 
 
 
 
 
 
 
 
 
 
 

Interregnums
1920 in Transjordan
1921 in Transjordan
States and territories established in 1920
States and territories disestablished in 1921
Transjordan (region)